Statutory law or statute law is written law passed by a body of legislature. This is opposed to oral or customary law; or regulatory law promulgated by the executive or common law of the judiciary. Statutes may originate with national, state legislatures or local municipalities.

Codified law

The term codified law refers to statutes that have been organized ("codified") by subject matter; in this narrower sense, some but not all statutes are considered "codified."  The entire body of codified statute is referred to as a "code," such as the United States Code, the Ohio Revised Code or the Code of Canon Law. The substantive provisions of the Act could be codified (arranged by subject matter) in one or more titles of the United States Code while the provisions of the law that have not reached their "effective date" (remaining uncodified) would be available by reference to the United States Statutes at Large. Another meaning of "codified law" is a statute that takes the common law in a certain area of the law and puts it in statute or code form.

Private law (particular law)
Another example of statutes that are not typically codified is a "private law" that may originate as a private bill, a law affecting only one person or a small group of persons. An example was divorce in Canada prior to the passage of the Divorce Act of 1968. If unavailable by administrative or judicial means, it was possible to obtain a legislative divorce by application to the Senate of Canada, which reviewed and investigated petitions for divorce, which would then be voted upon by the Senate and subsequently made into law. 

In the United Kingdom Parliament, private bills were used in the nineteenth century to create corporations, grant monopolies and give individuals attention to be more fully considered by the parliament. They are still used in relation to large infrastructure projects, such as HS2, where law is being created primarily to give effect to rights and powers being exercised by a private (even if largely state owned) entity.

In practice modern private bills are mixed and have both private and public aspects. In such cases the proposed legislation is called a hybrid bill.

Private Members Bills
In the UK, and other jurisdictions that derive their parliamentary systems from the UK model, individual backbencher members of parliament may introduce a bill themselves through a range of mechanisms. These are not official government bills and are called private member's bills. Such bills may also be introduced by the loyal opposition — members of the opposition party or parties. A private member's bill is not a private bill and the two should not be confused. A private member's bill is usually a public bill in that it is intended to have general effect. However, very few such bills go on to become law.

See also
Legislation
Legislative intent
Plain meaning rule
Statutory interpretation
Strict constructionism
Textualism

References

External links

Parliamentary Fact Sheets United Kingdom